Year 104 (CIV) was a leap year starting on Monday (link will display the full calendar) of the Julian calendar, the 104th Year of the Anno Domini (AD) designation, the 104th year of the 1st millennium, the 4th year of the 2nd century, and the 5th year of the 100s decade. At the time, it was known as the Year of the Consulship of Suburanus and Marcellus (or, less frequently, year 857 Ab urbe condita). The denomination 104 for this year has been used since the early medieval period, when the Anno Domini calendar era became the prevalent method in Europe for naming years.

Events 
 By place 

 Roman Empire 

 Pliny the Younger continues as a member of the College of Augurs (103–104).
 Nijmegen is renamed Ulpia Noviomagus Batavorum.
 A fire breaks out in Rome.

 Trajan gives the order to have the Alcántara Bridge, constructed by the architect Lacer, built over the Tagus River at Alcántara (Hispania). 
The bridge connects what is now Serbia with Romania (at the time known as Dacia).

 By topic 

 Religion 
 In India, figures of Buddha replace abstract motifs on decorative items.

Births 
 Chen Shi, Chinese politician and official (d. 187)
 Gaius Appuleius Diocles, Roman charioteer

Deaths

References